LIM domain only 2 (rhombotin-like 1), also known as LMO2, RBTNL1, RBTN2, RHOM2, LIM Domain Only Protein 2, TTG2, and T-Cell Translocation Protein 2, is a protein which in humans is encoded by the LMO2 gene.

Function 

LMO2 encodes a cysteine-rich, two LIM domain protein that is required for yolk sac erythropoiesis. The LMO2 protein has a central and crucial role in hematopoietic development and is highly conserved.

Clinical significance 

Aberrant LMO2 expression is a significant feature of T cell acute lymphoblastic leukaemia with multiple described mechanisms of activation. The LMO2 transcription start site is located approximately 25 kb downstream from the 11p13 T-cell translocation cluster (11p13 ttc), where a number of T-cell acute lymphoblastic leukemia-specific translocations occur.  An upstream noncoding DNA element is also the site of recurrent mutations in T cell acute lymphoblastic leukaemia, leading the recruitment of the transcription factor MYB and significant H3K27ac enrichment and thus the formation of an aberrant enhancer which up-regulates the expression of LMO2  Furthermore, recurrent and somatically acquired mutations of LMO2 intron 1 lead to its over-expression in both adult and paediatric T cell acute lymphoblastic leukaemia. These mutations introduce new transcription factor binding sites for MYB, ETS1 and RUNX1 allowing for the formation of an aberrant promoter which drives LMO2 expression.

Interactions 
LMO2 has been shown to interact with:

 GATA1, 
 GATA2, 
 JARID1A, 
 MLLT4, and
 TAL1

References

Further reading

External links